Ali Özkan Manav (born May 20, 1967) is a Turkish composer of contemporary classical music. His earlier works reveal influences of Saygun, Usmanbaş and Ligeti (in rhythmic and contrapuntal design), at times progressing through aleatoric sections (in orchestral works). Later works combine newer timbral concerns with maqamic pitch content, microtones and elements of folk music (ornamentations, vocal and instrumental practices, etc.).

Biography  
Born in Mersin, a Mediterranean city in Southern Turkey, his family moved to Istanbul in 1971. He was introduced to music by his mother, who was a ballet dancer before her marriage. He started private piano lessons with Hülya Saydam in 1980, his first compositions appeared in 1981. He entered at the Mimar Sinan University State Conservatory's composition department in 1984 and became a student of Erçivan Saydam (harmony and counterpoint), Adnan Saygun (composition, modal music and fugue) and Afşar Timuçin (history of thinking, literature and aesthetics). After his graduation in 1991, he was appointed as an instructor in the same institution. Between 1991-96 he was a student in the composition class of İlhan Usmanbaş; earned his master's degree in 1994, pursued qualification in arts studies until 1996. From 1996 to 1999 he studied at Boston University with Lukas Foss and Marjorie Merryman. Upon finishing his doctoral studies at Boston University, he returned to Turkey and began to teach composition at his native institution, Mimar Sinan Fine Arts University State Conservatory in Istanbul. At present he is a faculty member in the same institution.

Works

Orchestra 
Symposium (1991)

Andante Lugubre (1993)

Sforzati (1997–98)

Carian Diary (2001)

Portamento lento (2002)

Four Turkish Folk Songs (2010)

Chamber Ensemble 
Sinfonietta, wind instruments, timpani and xylophone (1989–90)

Symphonic Dances, 7 percussionists (1999-2000)

Reflections, piano and nine performers (2006)

Countryside Landscapes: Winter, fourteen string instruments (2007)

Uzun Hava, eight winds and two string instruments (2011)

Chamber Music 
Artvin Dance, brass quintet (1991, rev. 2002)

Sonata, violin and piano (1992)

Poems with Music, six musicians and narrator (1995–96)

Wanderings, two oboes, two clarinets and alto saxophone (1996−97, rev. 1998, 2004)

Laçin, arrangement for piano trio (2003)

Four Pieces for Five Clarinets (2003–04)

Reflections, accordion and piano (2004–05)

Three Turkish Folk Songs, violoncello and piano (2008–09)

The Land of Beautiful Horses, string quartet (2010)

String Quartet (2012)

Solo Instrument 
Partita, viola (1991−92, rev. 2003)

Face-to-Face with Saygun: Proliferations on Five Pieces from Modal Music, violin (2005)

Taqsim, clarinet (2005)

Pigeons, harp (2010)

Horon!, violin (2011)

Piano 
Movement 1 (1994)

Movement 2 (1998)

Movement 3 (2001)

Movement 4 (2001)

Movement 5 (2006)

Movement 6 (2009)

Vocals and piano 
Nazım Hikmet Songs, baritone and piano (1997–98)

Choir 
Spoon Dance Air (1990)

Dök zülfünü meydâna gel, polyphonic arrangement (1991)

Allam alam, polyphonic arrangement for choir and percussions (1994)

Kız sen geldin Çerkeş’ten, polyphonic arrangement (2001)

Book 
Müzikte Alımlama (Reception in Music), Pan Yayıncılık, Istanbul, 2012. [with Mehmet Nemutlu]

External links 
 http://www.ozkanmanav.com
 http://www.newmusicistanbul.com/composers/ozkan-manav
 http://www.brunel.ac.uk/bicmem/composers/ozkan-manav
 https://www.goodreads.com/book/show/60131106-muzikte-alimlama

References 

1967 births
Turkish composers
People from Mersin
Musicians from Istanbul
Living people